Sir George Stokes (1819–1903) was an Anglo-Irish mathematical physicist whose career left a prolific body of work in mathematics and physics. Below is a collection of some of the things named after him.

Physics
Campbell–Stokes recorder
Coriolis–Stokes force
Stokes equation
Stokes formula
Stokes' law of sound attenuation
Stokes line
 Stokes–Einstein (Stokes–Einstein–Sutherland) equation (translational diffusion)
Stokes–Einstein–Debye equation (rotational diffusion)

Fluid dynamics 
Stokes approximation
Navier–Stokes equations
Stokes first problem
Stokes second problem
Stokes drift
Stokes expansion, see section about Stokes expansion
Stokes flow
Stokes number
Stokes' paradox
Stokes radius
Stokes stream function
Stokes wave 
Stokes (unit)
Stokes' law
Stokeslet

Optics
 Stokes operators (quantum)
Stokes parameters
Stokes relations
Stokes shift
Stokes vector
Stokes lens

Mathematics
Navier–Stokes equations, see section on fluid dynamics
Navier–Stokes existence and smoothness
Stokes' theorem
Kelvin–Stokes theorem
Generalized Stokes theorem
Stokes operator 
Stokes phenomenon

Astronomical features
Stokes (lunar crater)
Stokes (Martian crater)

Stokes

Stokes